Erik Botheim (born 10 January 2000) is a Norwegian professional footballer who plays as a striker for Italian  club Salernitana.

Career
Erik Botheim started his career at Lyn and made his senior debut at 15 years old in June 2015, when he came off the bench against Ullern in a match that ended 2–2. He scored his first senior goal in October 2015, when he scored in Lyn's 9–2 win over Holmen.

In July 2016, Botheim signed for Rosenborg. He made his debut for Rosenborg on 26 April 2017 in the first round of the Norwegian Football Cup, when he started away to Strindheim in a match that ended with a 2–0 win. Later that season, on 17 September 2017, he got his league debut for Rosenborg against Vålerenga, coming on for Anders Trondsen after 81 minutes in a game Rosenborg won 3–0.
He scored his first Eliteserien goal against Tromsø on 7 July 2018. A year later, on 10 August 2019, Botheim scored his first hattrick, again scoring against Tromsø.
 On 15 February 2021, Botheim agreed a mutual termination of his contract. He joined FK Bodø/Glimt. On 21 October 2021, Botheim scored two goals in Bodo/Glimt's 6–1 drubbing of José Mourinho's Roma in the UEFA Europa Conference League.

On 22 December 2021, he signed a 3.5-year contract with Russian club Krasnodar. On 3 March 2022, following the Russian invasion of Ukraine, Krasnodar announced that his contract was suspended and he would not train with the team, but the contract was not terminated and remained valid. On 18 May 2022, his contract with Krasnodar was terminated.

On 7 July 2022, Botheim signed a contract until 2026 with Salernitana in Italy.

Personal life
In 2016 the music video for "Kygo jo" was uploaded to YouTube by Flow Kingz, a group consisting of Botheim and his Norway U18 teammates Erik Tobias Sandberg and Erling Haaland.  The video had by 2022 surpassed 8.8 million views and 275,000 likes.

Career statistics

Club

Honours
Rosenborg U16
Norwegian U-16 Championship: 2016

Rosenborg U19
Norwegian U-19 Championship: 2019

Rosenborg
Eliteserien: 2017, 2018
Norwegian Football Cup: 2018
Mesterfinalen: 2018

FK Bodø/Glimt
Eliteserien: 2021

References

External links
 Profile at RBK.no
 

2000 births
Living people
Footballers from Oslo
Norwegian footballers
Association football forwards
Norway youth international footballers
Norway under-21 international footballers
Lyn Fotball players
Rosenborg BK players
Stabæk Fotball players
FK Bodø/Glimt players
FC Krasnodar players
U.S. Salernitana 1919 players
Eliteserien players
Norwegian Second Division players
Serie A players
Norwegian expatriate footballers
Expatriate footballers in Russia
Expatriate footballers in Italy
Norwegian expatriate sportspeople in Russia
Norwegian expatriate sportspeople in Italy